Lubenham is a small rural village and civil parish  west of the market town of Market Harborough, in the Harborough district, in the south of Leicestershire, England. The first National Hunt Chase Challenge Cup was held in Lubenham, in the grounds of what is now Thorpe Lubenham Hall. Lubenham Parish extends to Gartree in the north and Bramfield Park in the west. The village appears in four entries in the Domesday Book of 1086.

Toponymy
Attested in the Domesday Book as 'Lobenho', the name derives from 'Luba's or Lubba's spur(s) of land'. 'Lubba' being the name of the individual who once lived on the land and 'hōh' meaning 'hill-spur'. At some point, the suffix 'hōh' developed into the modern suffix 'ham' which is a phenomenon that has appeared in other English place-names.

History
It is recorded in the Domesday Book that Lubenham was divided between three Anglo-Saxons named Arnketil, Oslac and Osmund in 1066. By 1086, the ownership of Lubenham had been transferred to the Norman ruling class as a result of the Norman conquest of England. In 1086, Lubenham was divided into three fiefs; the first fief was held by a man named Robert who held 8 carucates of land as a tenant of the Archbishop of York. The second fief of 7 carucates was held by Robert de Buci from Countess Judith and a man named Osbern held the third fief of 2 carucates from Robert de Todeni.

In 1327, William Baud secured a grant to hold two weekly markets and a yearly fair at whitsuntide at his manor in Lubenham. William's markets were unpopular among local landowners and in 1330 and 1335, Ralph Loterington of Thorpe Lubenham and Ralph Mallesours were accused of causing damage to property and assaulting market officials. This conflict may have arisen from political differences relating to the Despenser War.

In 1247, the manor once belonging to Countess Judith was held by the Mallesours family until Anne Mallesours married Roger Prestwiche in the 14th century and the lordship of the manor was transferred to the Prestwiche family. The manor was held by the Prestwiche family for five generations until the ownership, through a series of marriages, was transferred to the Brooke family. Sir Basil Brooke was the Lord of the Manor of Lubenham in 1600 and owned 13 of the 30 farms in Lubenham at that time. He lived in what is now the Old Hall; a moated manor house to the east of the village. In 1608, Sir Basil Brooke sat before the Star Chamber in Westminster regarding the inclosure of land in Lubenham and claimed that his income of £300 a year was insufficient. In 1624, the manor was sold by the Brooke family to Ranulph Crewe, Chief Justice of the King's Bench. King Charles I reportedly stayed at the Old Hall the night before his defeat at the Battle of Naseby in 1645.

Transport
On 6 June 1966, Lubenham railway station on the Rugby and Stamford Railway line closed in the Beeching Axe. Lubenham lies on the A4304 road which connects the M1 to Market Harborough, a route for heavy goods vehicles. A young schoolboy from the village was killed on the road in 2006, and the Adam Smile Project exists to create an off-road cycle route to Market Harborough using the track of the former railway and improve road safety.

Buildings
All Saints' Church, the medieval church at the centre of the village which holds regular services, has medieval wall paintings and box pews. Other features are the Easter sepulchre, the sedilia in the north chapel and the Renaissance reredos. The peal of 6 bells (augmented in 2000) is regularly rung by a band of volunteer ringers. Practice nights are Wednesdays from 7.30pm and visiting ringers of all standards are very welcome.

Papillon Hall was a country house outside Lubenham that was built in about 1620 and demolished in 1950. In about 1903 it was remodelled by the architect Sir Edwin Lutyens.

There is a public house, the Coach and Horses. The Tower House was built in 1771. 
Gore Lodge or "The House that Jack built" is a Grade II former farmhouse, converted to a hunting box with stables and cottage, in 1875 by Robert William Edis.

Events
Lubenham was judged to be Midlands Calor Village of the Year in 2001 because of its community activities, among them its scarecrow weekend.

The regular Open Gardens event in aid of All Saints' Church held in June each year provides an opportunity for visitors to visit around 20 private gardens. The Village Hall hosts clubs and events.

Lubenham has a beacon which was made for HM the Queen's Diamond Jubilee celebrations. The beacon designed and made by an apprentice has been lit on special royal occasions such as the jubilee and the Queen's 90th birthday.

The area boasts some lovely walks with abundant wildlife. Otters and kingfishers were seen on the River Welland in 2015.

In 2008/2009, the Lubenham Heritage Group published a Heritage Trail with an interpretation panel on the village green, a pamphlet and placed plaques on buildings of interest.

A cycling club known as the 'Lubenham Raiders' operates on Monday evenings, during the summer and has done so for many years, while other activities including short mat bowls, quizzes, heritage group and monthly coffee mornings take place in the Village Hall.

References

External links

  Images of Lubenham
  Lubenham Village website  old
  Parish Council
 History of the Parish
 OS Map of Lubenham from Multimap
 Lubenham Parish Walks
  Friends of Adam

Villages in Leicestershire
Civil parishes in Harborough District